The Chester Carnes House is a historic house in Albuquerque, New Mexico. It was built in 1923 by Lembke Construction for Chester Carnes, an optometrist who was the president of the New Mexico Optometric Association, his wife Helen, and their three sons. It was designed in the Mediterranean Revival architectural style. It was listed on the New Mexico State Register of Cultural Properties in 1979 and the National Register of Historic Places in 1980.

References

Houses completed in 1923
Mediterranean Revival architecture in New Mexico
National Register of Historic Places in Albuquerque, New Mexico
1923 establishments in New Mexico
Houses in Albuquerque, New Mexico
Houses on the National Register of Historic Places in New Mexico
New Mexico State Register of Cultural Properties